Colleen McGuinness (born May 21, 1977) is an American producer and screenwriter who has worked on the television shows 30 Rock,  About a Boy, and Mercy. After joining 30 Rock in 2011, she shared in its 2013 Emmy nomination for best series as well as in its 2013 and 2014 WGA nominations and 2014 PGA nomination. 
Together with Game of Thrones executive producer Carolyn Strauss, she is working with HBO to develop a comedy series based on the novel Prep by Curtis Sittenfeld.

Early life and education
McGuinness was born in Killeen, Texas, and was raised by her grandparents in Islip, New York. McGuinness was a tennis champion in high school. She earned a Bachelor of Arts degree in English from Harvard University in 1999.

Career

McGuinness began her career at Castle Rock Entertainment and later became a development assistant at New Line Cinema.

McGuinness's early writing credits include story-editor work for prime-time soap opera North Shore and a staff writer position with Alicia Silverstone's Miss Match. In 2004, she scripted the Nintendo DS video game Sprung.

McGuinness was hired by 30 Rock in 2011 and served as producer, co-producer, and writer during the show's final two seasons. She is listed as co-writer (with Jack Burditt) of one of the show's 2012 episodes, "My Whole Life Is Thunder", and as sole writer for another, "St. Patrick's Day".

After 30 Rock stopped production, McGuinness worked as a writer and supervising producer for About A Boy. When Tina Fey started her new production company Little Stranger productions, her company's first sale was an untitled comedy to be written by McGuinness and executive-produced by Fey and by former 30 Rock showrunner Robert Carlock.

References

American people of Irish descent
American people of Korean descent
American women television writers
Living people
American women screenwriters
Screenwriters from Texas
People from Killeen, Texas
Screenwriters from New York (state)
People from Islip (town), New York
American television writers
21st-century American women
Harvard University alumni
1977 births